The 1962 Volta a Catalunya was the 42nd edition of the Volta a Catalunya cycle race and was held from 9 September to 16 September 1962. The race started in Montjuïc and finished in Barcelona. The race was won by Antonio Karmany.

General classification

References

1962
Volta
1962 in Spanish road cycling
September 1962 sports events in Europe